The Phantom Submarine is a 1940 American adventure film directed by Charles Barton and written by Joseph Krumgold. The film stars Anita Louise, Bruce Bennett, Oscar O'Shea, John Tyrrell, Pedro de Cordoba and Victor Wong. The film was released on December 20, 1940, by Columbia Pictures.

Plot

Journalist and US Navy frogman investigate U-boat terror.

Cast          
Anita Louise as Madeleine Neilson
Bruce Bennett as Paul Sinclair
Oscar O'Shea as Captain Velsar
John Tyrrell as Dreaux
Pedro de Cordoba as Henri Jerome
Victor Wong as Willie Ming
Charles McMurphy as 2nd Mate
Harry Strang as Chief Engineer
Don Beddoe as Bartlett

References

External links
 

1940 films
1940s English-language films
American adventure films
1940 adventure films
Columbia Pictures films
Films directed by Charles Barton
1940s American films